Chionodes obelus is a moth in the family Gelechiidae. It is found in North America, where it has been recorded from California.

The larvae feed on Ceanothus cuneatus.

References

Chionodes
Moths described in 1999
Moths of North America